{{Infobox video game
|image=Stretchmo logo.png
|caption= Stretchmos official logo
|developer=Intelligent Systems
|publisher=Nintendo
|director=Taku SugiokaMisuzu Yoshida
|producer=Toshio SengokuNaoki NakanoHiroyuki Yamada
|artist=Narumi Kubota
|programmer=Tatsuya Kikkawa
|composer=Yasuhisa BabaTakeru Kanazaki
|platforms=Nintendo 3DS
|released=
|genre=Puzzle
|modes=Single-player
The game is a sequel to Pushmo, Crashmo, and Pushmo World and was released on the Nintendo eShop.

Overview

Stretchmo follows the format of previous games, where the player uses Mallo to push and pull parts of the puzzle to reach the top. This game introduces the ability to stretch pieces out in addition to pushing and pulling. Some levels also contain hazards that can attack the player.

After completing a free seven-stage demo, players can purchase four more attractions: Playtime Plaza, Sculpture Square, Fortress of Fun, and NES Expo, either individually or as a discounted set. Purchasing any attractions unlocks the Stretchmo Studio, where players can create their own puzzles and share them using QR codes. Purchasing and completing all four attractions unlocks a fifth attraction, The Perilous Peak, with more challenging puzzles.

ReceptionStretchmo'' received "favorable" reviews according to the review aggregation website Metacritic. The game was praised for its graphics and new gameplay (especially controlling a new character) but criticized for its lack of originality and occasional technical issues.

Notes

References

External links

2015 video games
Intelligent Systems games
Nintendo games
Nintendo 3DS games
Nintendo 3DS eShop games
Nintendo 3DS-only games
Puzzle video games
Video games developed in Japan
Video game sequels